Christos Vasilopoulos (born April 16, 1978) is a Greek theatre, television and film actor. He is best known for portraying Lefteri on Erotas. He appeared as Olek in the first season of the Cinemax series Banshee.

Filmography 
 1999 Diakritiki goiteia ton arsenikon, I
 2003 Hartino karavi 
 2005 Erotas (TV series)
 2005 Omiros 
 2006 Istories tou astynomou Beka, Oi (TV series) – Christos Alexandris
 2007 Alithinoi erotes (TV series)
 2007 Deligianneion Parthenagogeion (TV series) – Rodolfos Pagourelis
 2008 Matomena homata (Serial TV)  – Stratis Xenos
 2008 Lola (TV series) – Grigoris Exarhos
 2010 Love at First Sight? (short) – Chris (as Christos G. Vass)
 2011 A Quick Stop (short) – The Cop (as Christos G. Vass)
 2011 Fresh Pursuit – David Komb
 2011 The Closer (TV series) – David Komb
 2011 Traci Lords: Last Drag (video short) 
 2012 Hollywood Dream – Alexandros
 2012 Paramithiasmenes (TV series) – Alexandros
 2012 Pleasure or Pain – Jack (as Christos G. Vass)
 2012 The Survival Game (video) – Hector (as Christos G. Vass)
 2013-2014 Banshee  – Olek
 2015 Metal Gear Solid V: The Phantom Pain (video game) – Dr. Evangelos Constantinou
 2015 Pocket Listing - Victor
 2015 Blindspot (TV series) - Misha
 2015 Caged No More
2016 Guys Reading Poems - The Director
2016 Days of Our Lives - Young Victor Kiriakis
2017 Camp Cool Kids - Instructor Mark
2017 The Last Ship (TV series) - Stavros Diomedes
2018 Assassin's Creed Odyssey (video game) - Greek Civilian (voice)
2019 Whiskey Cavalier - Marco
2020 Warrior - Smits
2021 Antidote - Rizzo 
2022 The Enforcer'' - Silvio

Personal life 
Vasilopoulos married Antonia Ventouras on July 2, 2011. The wedding was held in Fiscardo, on the Island of Kefalonia, Greece.

The marriage ended in 2012 and their divorce was officially filed in 2014.

References

Further reading

External links

1978 births
Living people
Greek male television actors
21st-century Greek male actors
Place of birth missing (living people)
Male actors from Athens